Aschbach may refer to:

 People
 Alexander Äschbach, Swiss cyclist
 Joseph Aschbach, German historian

 Places
 Aschbach, Bas-Rhin, France
 Aschbach, Rhineland-Palatinate, Germany
 Aschbach-Markt, Austria

 Rivers
 Aschbach (Wern), Lower Franconia, Bavaria, Germany, tributary of the Wern

See also 
 Haschbach am Remigiusberg